Veterans for Britain is a pro-Brexit organisation opposing British involvement in the Common Security and Defence Policy of the European Union (EU).

Formation

It was formed in 2016 in the context of the referendum of that year on the United Kingdom's membership of the EU. It has had links to the Vote Leave campaigning organisation from which it received a donation.
Veterans for Britain was set up “to put forward the Defence and Security arguments for the UK to vote to leave the European Union”.

Membership

Veterans for Britain has attracted the support of senior figures with a military background. Supporters listed on its website have included Charles Guthrie, Baron Guthrie of Craigiebank, retired Chief of the Defence Staff.

Policies
Veterans for Britain takes the view that it retains an important role after the membership referendum.
The organisation is pro-NATO and opposed to UK involvement in the EU's new political initiatives in defence, on which it attempts to raise awareness. It is opposed to UK involvement in EU policies on defence procurement, which they say work against the notion of cross-border access to defence contracts and instead create a protectionist EU market for defence, expanding the regulatory and financial role of the EU in defence industry and procurement, while tying both of those to the EU's expanding military policy. 

Veterans for Britain has also become involved in controversies regarding prosecution of veterans for crimes committed when they were serving in the armed forces. It has appointed Hilary Meredith, a solicitor known for her work on behalf of armed forces personnel, to its board.

References

External links
 official website

Brexit–related advocacy groups in the United Kingdom